The Mechanical Cow is an Oswald the Lucky Rabbit cartoon from 1927. It was distributed by Universal Pictures. The cartoon was re-released by Walter Lantz Productions in 1932 with music and sound effects added.

Plot 

Oswald and his mechanical cow are sleeping in adjacent beds. The alarm clock wakes up Oswald, who has a brief fight with the clock. He attempts to get the cow out of bed but the cow refuses to get up. Finally Oswald coaxes the cow onto a slide which propels him down to a lower floor onto four roller skates. Oswald rides on the cow outside while announcing that he has milk to sell. A mother hippopotamus buys some for her infant hippo, which Oswald dispenses from the cow's udder directly into the baby's mouth. Fanny, Oswald's girlfriend, comes to buy some milk and Oswald flirts with her.

Suddenly, a car containing some dark, unidentified figures appears, and they kidnap Fanny and drive away. Oswald follows, riding on the mechanical cow. The figures shoot at Oswald but he evades their bullets. Oswald causes the cow's neck to elongate in a scissors mechanism, reaching the car. He runs along the neck and extracts Fanny from the car. They ride away on the cow, with the car now pursuing them. Oswald and Fanny fall off a cliff but Oswald grabs a branch to stop their fall. The pursuing car also falls over the cliff, with the nefarious figures falling out of the car into a body of water where they are eaten by fishes. Oswald and Fanny ride off on the mechanical cow.

Home media
The short was released on December 11, 2007, on Walt Disney Treasures: The Adventures of Oswald the Lucky Rabbit.

References 

1927 films
1920s Disney animated short films
American black-and-white films
1927 animated films
Oswald the Lucky Rabbit cartoons
Films directed by Walt Disney
American silent short films
Universal Pictures animated short films
Animated films about animals
Animated films without speech
Films about cattle
Films about kidnapping
1920s English-language films
1920s American films
Silent American comedy films
Public domain